Widcombe Crescent in Bath, Somerset, England is a terrace of 14 Georgian houses built in 1808 by Thomas Baldwin, and designated a Grade I listed building.

The three-storey houses, which have mansard roofs, are stepped up from either side to central 2 houses which project slightly.

Famous residents include Sir James Brooke, the 'White Rajah' of Sarawak in Borneo, who lived in Number 1 from 1831–1834.

See also

 List of Grade I listed buildings in Bath and North East Somerset

References

Houses completed in 1808
Grade I listed buildings in Bath, Somerset
Streets in Bath, Somerset